Rodolfo Gnavi (born 17 September 1949 in Argentina) is a former footballer who played one match for the Australia national association football team.

Playing career

Club career
After stints at Argentinos Juniors and Club Atlético Lanús in Argentina and Club Toluca in Mexico, Gnavi arrived in Australia in 1974 to play for Pan Hellenic in the New South Wales State League. In 1977, he transferred to St. George for $9,000. He played 68 National Soccer League matches for St. George between 1977 and 1980.

International career
Gnavi played one match for Australia in 1975 against the USSR.

References

External links
 BDFA profile

Australian soccer players
Argentine emigrants to Australia
Argentine footballers
Sydney Olympic FC players
Deportivo Toluca F.C. players
Argentinos Juniors footballers
Australia international soccer players
Naturalised citizens of Australia
1949 births
Living people
Place of birth missing (living people)
Association football midfielders